"Después de Ti...¿Qué?" is a song written by Rudy Pérez and first recorded by Puerto Rican singer, José Feliciano in his album Ya Soy Tuyo (1985). In 1997, Mexican female trio Pandora covered the songs on their live album Hace Tres Noches Apenas. This version peaked at #30 on the Hot Latin Songs chart and #13 on the Latin Pop Airplay chart. In the same year, Cristian Castro covered the song on his fifth album, Lo Mejor de Mi, with Raúl di Blasio as the pianist. It was released in 1998 as the fourth and last single. In 2006, Feliciano and Castro recorded the song as a duet on Feliciano's collaboration album José Feliciano y Amigos.

Chart performance (Pandora version)

Chart performance (Cristian Castro version)

Music video (Cristian Castro version)
A music video featuring Raúl Di Blasio was shot.

References

1997 singles
1998 singles
Cristian Castro songs
José Feliciano songs
Spanish-language songs
Songs written by Rudy Pérez
Song recordings produced by Rudy Pérez
1985 songs
EMI Latin singles
Sony BMG singles
Pandora (musical group) songs